David Glen Nied (born December 22, 1968) is an American professional baseball pitcher. He played in Major League Baseball for the Atlanta Braves and Colorado Rockies from 1992 through 1996.

Career
Nied attended Duncanville High School in Duncanville, Texas. He was drafted out of high school by the Atlanta Braves in the 14th round of the 1987 Major League Baseball draft. Baseball America rated Nied as the 56th best prospect in baseball prior to the 1992 season and the 23rd best prospect in baseball prior to the 1993 season.

Despite excelling in 1992 spring training, Nied was optioned to the Triple-A Richmond Braves to start the 1992 season. He made his major league debut for the Braves on September 1, 1992, after MLB rosters expanded.

Nied was the first pick for the expansion Colorado Rockies in the 1992 Major League Baseball expansion draft. Nied started in the first ever game for the Rockies, taking the loss against the New York Mets. He also pitched a number of other firsts for the Rockies, including first strikeout, first walk, first complete game, and first complete game shutout.

Nied compiled a 5–9 won-loss record in 1993 then went 9–7 in 1994 but won no more games through the next two years, playing sparingly.

In 1996 Nied was granted free agency and joined the Cincinnati Reds organization on November 14, 1996, but never appeared in a game in the majors or minors again and departed the game.

Personal life
Nied retired from baseball at 28 after an arm injury. He now sells equipment for his father's agricultural products company. He is married to his second wife, Heather Cranford, who is a former contestant on the TV show The Bachelor. Nied has four sons, two each from both marriages.

References

External links

David Nied Biography
Colorado Rockies Team Firsts
Richmond Braves Diamond Anniversary team 
Sports Illustrated page

Baseball players from Dallas
Major League Baseball pitchers
Colorado Rockies players
1968 births
Living people
People from Duncanville, Texas
Duncanville High School alumni
Burlington Braves players
Central Valley Rockies players
Colorado Springs Sky Sox players
Durham Bulls players
Greenville Braves players
New Haven Ravens players
Portland Rockies players
Richmond Braves players
Salem Avalanche players
Sumter Braves players